Galimpur is a union parishad of Baruda upazila in Comilla district of Bangladesh.

Location and boundaries 
Location of Galimpur Union in the south-east of Barura Upazila. It is bounded on the north-east by Shilmuri South Union and Shilmuri North Union, on the north by Baruda Municipality, on the west by Shakpur Union and Vauksar Union, on the south-west by Payalgachha Union and on the south-east by Bakai Union of Laksam Upazila and Bakai North Union of Lalmai Upazila.

Administrative structure 
No. 11 Union Parishad is under Baruda Upazila of Galimpur Union. Administrative activities of this union are under Baruda police station. It is part of Comilla-6, the 256th constituency of the Jatiya Sangsad.

See also 
 Barura Upazila
 Comilla District

References

External links 

Coordinates not on Wikidata
Cumilla District
Unions of Barura Upazila